Charles Frazer Hermann (born June 29, 1938) holds the Brent Scowcroft Chair in International Policy Studies at the George Bush School of Government and Public Service at Texas A&M University. He is an expert in matters relating to American foreign policy, crisis management, and decision-making.

Hermann joined Texas A&M University in 1995 when he was called to serve as the founding Director of the Bush School, which was established as part of President George H. W. Bush’s Presidential Library complex at Texas A&M University.

From 1969 to 1970, Hermann served on the United States National Security Council (NSC) staff under the then National Security Advisor, Henry Kissinger. His appointment to NSC was through the International Affairs Fellowship of Council on Foreign Relations.

Hermann is an author/editor of nine books and numerous journal articles on issues relating to foreign policy, simulation, national security, and group decision-making. His most recent book, When Things Go Wrong: Foreign Policy Decision Making under Adverse Feedback – a book about managing foreign and security policy in cases of protracted decision making – presented an enlightening and systematic investigation of one of the big questions in public policy. It answered the central question of – "what do foreign policy decision makers do when things go wrong?"  It addresses situations in which foreign policy makers receive feedback that the policy they are following is failing. The book was hailed as an interesting and useful source that provided some necessary tools for analyzing complex decision-making processes.

Before serving on the National Security Council, Hermann taught at the Woodrow Wilson School of Public and International Affairs at Princeton University. During that time, he authored the book, Crisis in Foreign Policy: A Simulation Analysis, in which, he presented several models of crisis decision-making and tested them against the data from an international simulation series and U.S. foreign policy cases. In this work, Hermann conducted an exemplary simulation-experiment, which yielded both proactive findings and a stimulating post hoc model. M.J. Driver, writing in the American Political Science Review in September 1970, suggested that the book be used as a primer for simulation-experiment design. Michael Banks, writing for the Royal Institute of International Affairs, said that the book is likely to become an essential work of reference for any specialized study of crisis in the future. One of the major contributions of the book was a rigorous definition of crisis specifying the conditions which differentiate it from normal circumstances, and a basic hypothesis stating that the pattern of decision-making varies from one situation to the other.

Education and career
Charles Hermann received a BA in political science from DePauw University in 1960. He completed an MA in political science in 1963, and a PhD in political science in 1965, both from Northwestern University.

Hermann served as a professor of political science at Ohio State University – from 1970 to 1995 – after a stint at the National Security Council under Henry Kissinger. There he also served as the director of the Mershon Center, an academic research center dedicated to national security and foreign policy issues from 1980 to 1995 as well as the acting vice provost for international affairs at Ohio State University. During 1991–1992, Hermann also served as a Fellow in the Pew Case Program of the Kennedy School at Harvard University.

Hermann is a member of Council on Foreign Relations, American Political Science Association, International Studies Association, International Society for Political Psychology, and the Arms Control Association.

Mershon Center
Charles Hermann served as Director of the Mershon Center for International Security Studies at The Ohio State University from 1980 to 1995 (interrupted for two years to serve as Acting Vice Provost for International Affairs at Ohio State). The Mershon Center funded faculty and PhD research and educational projects dealing with national and international security.  It encouraged faculty to seek relevant external grants and contracts with a vigorous matching program from the endowment established by Ralph D. Mershon. Additionally as Director of the Mershon Center for International Security Studies, Charles Hermann initiated several projects designed to advance both scholarly and public knowledge about international affairs and foreign policy.  
In 1984 he created the Edgar S. Furniss Award, named for the first director of the Mershon Center. Given annually, the award is presented to an author whose first book makes an exceptional contribution to the study of national and international security.

In 1985 he provided resources and encouragement to his Mershon colleague, Professor Joe Kruzel, to create and edit an annual review of critical issues in American defense policy. The first edition, of the AMERICAN DEFENSE ANNUAL appeared in 1986. It continued each year until Kruzel took a leave from the Mershon Center to serve as Deputy Assistant Secretary of Defense for NATO and Europe.  Hemann assumed editorship of the 9th edition. Tragically, Professor Kruzel was killed in Bosnia while working to establish peace negotiations and Hermann left the Mershon Center in 1995. The book series was not continued.

In 1994 Hermann negotiated with the International Studies Association to jointly sponsor a new journal of analytical essays and reviews designated as The Mershon International Studies Review. After Hermann left the Mershon Center, the International Studies Association continued the journal as The International Studies Review, which remains a vital, widely used resource.

Publications

Books
Crisis in Foreign Policy:  A Simulation Analysis, was published by Bobbs-Merrill in 1969. 234 pp. (ASIN: B0006BYNTC)
Courses in Foreign Policy: An Anthology of Syllabi, co-edited with Kenneth Waltz was published by SAGE Publications in 1969. 117 pp. (ASIN B007EMSD1K)
International Crises: Insights from Behavioral Research, ed. 1972, was published by Free Press. 334 pp.
CREON: A Foreign Event Data Set as part of the Sage Professional Papers in International Studies, edited by Maurice East, Margaret Hermann, Barbara Salmore, and Stephen Salmore, was published by SAGE Publications in 1973. 104 pp.
Why Nations Act: Theoretical Perspectives for Comparative Foreign Policy Studies as part of the SAGE Focus Editions, was co-edited with Maurice East and Stephen Salmore, published by SAGE Publications in 1978. 225 pp.
New Directions in the Study of Foreign Policy, edited by Charles Kegley and James Rosenau, was published by Routledge in 1987. 538 pp.
American Defense Annual, 1994, ed. 1994, was published by Lexington Books. 351 pp.
Violent Conflict in the 21st Century: Causes, Instruments & Mitigation, was co-edited with Harold Jacobson and Anne S. Moffat, published by American Academy of Arts & Sciences in 1999. 134 pp.
When Things Go Wrong: Foreign Policy Decision Making Under Adverse Feedback as part of the Foreign Policy Analysis Series, ed. 2012, was published by Routledge. 194 pp.

Other publications
Hermann's numerous publications appear in various political and international affairs journals including American Political Science Review, World Politics, International Studies Quarterly, Journal of Conflict Resolution, Policy Studies Journal, and International Encyclopedia of the Social Sciences, amongst others. Hermann has also authored various technical research reports and policy documents for National Science Foundation; U.S. Naval Ordnance Test Station, China Lake, California; Advanced Research Projects Agency, Human Resources Research Office of the Office of Naval Research amongst others. A complete list of his publications is available online.

Personal life
Hermann is married to Lorraine Eden and they have three children. He lives in College Station, Texas with his wife and has been actively involved in local community volunteer activities for many years.

References

1938 births
Living people
American political scientists
Texas A&M University faculty
Ohio State University faculty
DePauw University alumni
Northwestern University alumni
United States Department of Defense officials